Chiaromonte is an Italian surname. Notable people with the surname include:
Francesca Chiaromonte, Italian statistician
Gerardo Chiaromonte (1924–1993), Italian Communist politician, journalist and writer
Nicola Chiaromonte (1905–1972), Italian activist and writer

Italian-language surnames